Baki Hanma, also known as Hanma Baki – Son of Ogre, is a 2021 original net animation series adapted from the manga of the same name written and illustrated by Keisuke Itagaki. It covers the third part of the manga Baki the Grappler series and is directed by Toshiki Hirano at TMS Entertainment. On September 21, 2020, it was announced Baki Hanma will be adapted as the third series and the sequel to the second season of the Netflix series. The 12-episode series was released on September 30, 2021, on Netflix. A second season was announced on March 24, 2022. For episodes 1–12, the first opening theme is "Treasure Pleasure" performed by Granrodeo while the first ending theme is "Unchained World" performed by Generations from Exile Tribe.


Series Overview

Episode list

Season 1: Combat Shadow Fighting Saga/Great Prison Battle Saga (2021)

Season 2: Pickle Wars Saga (TBA)

Notes

References

Hanma Baki
Baki